WLSK (100.9 FM) is a radio station broadcasting a country music format. Licensed to Lebanon, Kentucky, United States.  The station is currently owned by Jonathan Smith, through licensee Choice Radio Central Corporation, and features programming from ABC Radio, Jones Radio Network and Westwood One.

History
On November 29, 2011, WLSK changed their format from adult hits (as "Mike FM") to country, branded as "Country Mike 100.9".

References

External links

LSK
Lebanon, Kentucky
Country radio stations in Kentucky